Amandyk Batalov (Amandyq Ǵabbasuly Batalov; November 22, 1952) is a Kazakh politician who is currently the Governor of Almaty Region since August 20, 2014.
Hydraulic engineer by profession, he served as the Acting First Deputy Governor of Almaty region (since April 2008), the mayor of Zhetysu district of Almaty, the first deputy chief of administration of Kalinin district of Almaty, vice-president of the "Construction industry and technology" concern.

Early life and engineering

Amandyk Gabbasuly Batalov was born in 1952, in Nukus, in Uzbekistan. After graduating from the Dzhambul Institute for Water Management, Batalov worked as a construction foreman, principal engineer and SMU-37 for the construction company, ‘Almaataotdelstroi’ from 1981 to 1985. From 1985 to 1987, he held various positions in the following organizations: 
	Senior construction foreman, chief engineer and head of the construction company, ‘Almaataotdelstroi’  (1981-1985)
	Instructor of the Lenin district Committee of Communist party of Kazakhstan
	Secretary of the regional Committee of trade union of workers of construction and construction materials
	Instructor  of the Department of construction and municipal economy of Almaty city for the Committee of the Communist party of Kazakhstan (1985-1987);
	The Chairman of the regional committee of the trade union of workers of construction and construction materials industry (1987-1989)
	Leading specialist and chief specialist of the Department of construction and  construction materials industry management for the Affairs of the Council of Ministers of the Kazakh Soviet Socialist Republic (1989-1991)
	Assistant to the department of construction and construction materials industry of the Presidential office of the Kazakh Soviet Socialist Republic (1991-1992) 
	Vice-President of the group, ‘Construction industry and technology’ (1992)

Political career

•	Deputy and first Deputy head of administration of the Kalinin district of Almaty city (1992-1994)
•	The head of Lenin district administration (1994-1995)
•	Mayor of Zhetysu district of Almaty city (1995-2001)
•	Deputy mayor of Almaty region (06.2001-04.2008)
•	First Deputy Governor of Almaty region (04.2008-08.2014)
•	Mayor of Almaty region (20.08.2014, powers extended to 22.11.2020)
•	Member of the National Commission for the implementation of the ‘program of modernization of public consciousness’ led by the President of the Republic of Kazakhstan (since April 17, 2017)
•	Representative for the local government to the Parliament of Kazakhstan for the ‘Nur Otan’ party (since February 3, 2016)

Sports activities

•	The President of the Volleyball Federation of Almaty city and Almaty region (since 2001)
•	Master of sports in volleyball, he is the current President of the volleyball Federation of Almaty city and Almaty region (since 2001) and the volleyball club ‘Zhetysu’.

Social activities

•	Member of the Board of Directors of the National company ‘Socio-entrepreneurial Corporation’, ‘ZHETYSU’ (06.2008)
•	Chairman of the Board of Directors of the National company ‘Socio-entrepreneurial Corporation’, ‘ZHETYSU’ (12.2014)

Honors

Orders of ‘Kurmet’ (2008) and ‘Parasat’  (December 15, 2014)
Medals of ‘Astana’ and ‘10 years of Kazakhstan's independence’
The sign of ‘Honorary worker for sport for the Republic of Kazakhstan’
The title of ‘Academician of the International Informatization Academy’

Personal life

Batalov is married to  Bagda Utegulovna Batalova (Bekturganova) and they have three children -  Sayora (1977), Adilbek (1982) and Islambek (1994).

References

1952 births
Governors of Almaty Region
Living people